Stage Madness is a 1927 American drama film directed by Victor Schertzinger and written by Randall Faye. The film stars Virginia Valli, Tullio Carminati, Virginia Bradford, Lou Tellegen, Richard Walling and Tyler Brooke. The film was released on January 9, 1927, by Fox Film Corporation.

Cast         
Virginia Valli as Madame Lamphier
Tullio Carminati as Andrew Marlowe
Virginia Bradford as Dora Anderson
Lou Tellegen as Pierre Doumier
Richard Walling as Jimmy Mason
Tyler Brooke as H.H. Bragg
Lillian Knight as French Maid
Bodil Rosing as Maid

References

External links
 

1927 films
1920s English-language films
Silent American drama films
1927 drama films
Fox Film films
Films directed by Victor Schertzinger
American silent feature films
American black-and-white films
1920s American films